Mršići is a village in Vlasenica, Republika Srpska, Bosnia and Herzegovina.

References 

Populated places in Vlasenica